1958 is a year. 1958 may also refer to:

 by Soul-Junk 2003
1958 Miles, album by Miles Davis 1958
1958, album by John Coltrane 1993
"1958", song by the New Jordal Swingers  Norway 1980
"1958" (A Day to Remember song), 2005
1958 (film), a 1980 Norwegian drama film directed by Oddvar Bull Tuhus